The Central Mosque of Imam Sarakhsi, commonly known as the Bishkek Central Mosque (is a mosque in Bishkek, Kyrgyzstan.

The construction of the mosque started in 2012 and it was inaugurated in 2018. It was funded by the Turkish Diyanet. It is one of several mosques funded by Turkey across the world. Built in an Ottoman revival style, the mosque is one of the largest in Central Asia. It has the capacity to accommodate 30,000 worshipers.

History 
Construction of the mosque started in 2012. It was later decided that the mosque would be named after Al-Sarakhsi, a medieval Islamic scholar.

The mosque was inaugurated on 2 September 2018. The opening ceremony was attended by Kyrgyz President Sooronbai Jeenbekov and his Turkish counterpart Recep Tayyip Erdogan.

Architecture 

The mosque is built in an Ottoman revival style, with four minarets, each with three balconies. It resembles the Kocatepe Mosque in design. The mosque has a capacity of 9000 people in the closed space, and 30,000 people overall.

See also 

 Islam in Kyrgyzstan

References 

2018 establishments in Kyrgyzstan
Buildings and structures in Bishkek
Mosques completed in 2018
Mosques in Kyrgyzstan